Gary Stills (born July 11, 1974) is a former American football linebacker who played ten seasons in the National Football League (NFL). He played college football for West Virginia University. He was drafted by the Kansas City Chiefs in the third round of the 1999 NFL Draft, and also played for the Baltimore Ravens, St. Louis Rams and Las Vegas Locomotives.

Early years
Stills attended Valley Forge Military Academy, where as a senior he registered 162 tackles with 7.5 sacks.

College career
Stills played college football at West Virginia University. During his career, he finished with 159 tackles and 26 sacks. He majored in sports management.

His best season was in 1997. As a junior, he finished the year with 12 sacks. In the season opener against Marshall, Stills had a school-record 4 sacks. He finished the year with 67 total tackles while earning all-Big East honors.

Professional career

Kansas City Chiefs
Stills was selected by the Kansas City Chiefs in the third round (75th overall) in the 1999 NFL Draft. In his rookie year, he only played in two games and was inactive for the other 14. In 2000, he played 11 games on special teams and finished the year with ten tackles. The following year, he posted 15 tackles and also had a period in NFL Europe, playing for the Frankfurt Galaxy. In 2002, he played in all 16 games and finished the campaign with a career high 44 tackles and two sacks. 2003 was another solid year for Stills, who recorded 38 tackles and a career high three sacks. He was selected to his first Pro Bowl. In 2004, he played in 16 games making 30 tackles and 2.5 sacks. In his final year with the Chiefs, he recorded 19 tackles. He was known for his tremendous special teams play, and his famous celebration in which he "punches the ground" after he would tackle a returner. However, the Chiefs later released Stills.

Baltimore Ravens
Stills signed with the Baltimore Ravens before the 2006 season. In his first year with the franchise, he played in 16 games and recorded a team record 44 special teams tackles. In 2007, he again played in 16 games and finished the season with 15 tackles and one sack. He was released from the Ravens on August 30, 2008, during final cuts.

St. Louis Rams
Two days after being let go by the Ravens, Stills was signed by the St. Louis Rams on September 1, 2008.

Las Vegas Locomotives
Stills was drafted by the Las Vegas Locomotives on June 18, 2009.

NFL statistics

Personal life
His two sons, Dante and Darius, are currently attending West Virginia University and are members of the West Virginia Mountaineers football team.

References

External links
Just Sports Stats

1974 births
Living people
Players of American football from Trenton, New Jersey
African-American players of American football
American football defensive ends
American football linebackers
West Virginia Mountaineers football players
Kansas City Chiefs players
Frankfurt Galaxy players
Baltimore Ravens players
St. Louis Rams players
American Conference Pro Bowl players
Las Vegas Locomotives players
Omaha Nighthawks players
Valley Forge Military Academy Trojans football players
21st-century African-American sportspeople
20th-century African-American sportspeople